Telephone numbers in Hong Kong are mostly eight-digit. Fixed land line numbers start with 2 or 3, mobile (cellular) phone numbers with 5, 6, 7 or 9, pager numbers with 7 and forwarding service with 8. Since the end of 1989, there have been no area codes within Hong Kong.

The telephone number for emergency services – Police, Fire Service and Ambulance – is 999 for all telephone lines. These numbers can also be used for mobile and other users:
 992 – fax on fixed line, SMS on mobile phones (for subscribers with disabilities)
 112 – mobile phones

Some special numbers are three- to five-digit. Some premium rate services, for example for games and adult contents, are 11-digit. Numbers beginning with '1' are usually reserved for carrier/operator services. These services are provided by the individual telephone carrier. In general, these numbers can be used across all carriers:
 Directory services – 1081 (English), 1083 (Cantonese) and 1088 (Mandarin)
 Time and temperature information – 18501 (English), 18503 (Cantonese) and 18508 (Mandarin)

The international call prefix varies depending on IDD provider, however 001 works on all phone lines and uses the IDD service provided by the same carrier as the telephone line that 001 call is dialed from. During the years of telephone monopoly, the International call prefix was 106 (through 1980s) and then 001. Calls from Hong Kong to Macau and mainland China are international, and include that regions' country code:
 Macau +853 xxxx xxxx
 Mainland China +86 (area code) xxxx xxxx

Present numbering scheme and format

The present structure and format of telephone numbers in Hong Kong according to the Hong Kong Telecom Service Numbering Scheme, is as follows (the first digits of the telephone number is used as follows):

 001 – International long-distance voice service access code
 002 – International long-distance fax / data service access code
 003 to 009 – International gateway access code
 100xxxx to 107xxxx – Inquiry / hotline / operator-assisted service
 1081 – Directory Services in English
 1083 – Directory Services in Cantonese
 1088 – Directory Services in Mandarin
 109 – Telephone repair
 112 – Emergency Calls (Mobile Phones only, redirects to 999)
 115 to 118 – International Routing Network Identification Number
 12xxxxx – Inquiry / hotline / operator-assisted service
 133 – Enable the Restricted Caller ID feature
 1357 – Cancel the "Caller ID Restrictions" feature
 14 – Network identification number
 15 to 16 – External telecommunications service access code
 17xxxxx – Operator-assisted service
 1801x – PPS (Payment by Phone Service)
 1803x – PPS (Payment by Phone Service)
 18060x – PPS (Payment by Phone Service)
 1808 – International calls search service
 181 – Helpdesk/Hotline
 182xxxx – High-traffic telephone line
 182182 – Employees Retraining Board
 1823 – Hong Kong SAR Government Efficiency Unit
 18281 – Tung Wah Group of Hospitals
 18282 – The Community Chest of Hong Kong
 18288 – Caritas Family Services
 183xxxx – High-traffic telephone line
 184xx – Hong Kong Jockey Club
 18501 – Time and temperature information service in English
 18503 – Time and temperature information service in Cantonese 
 18508 – Time and temperature information service in Mandarin
 186xxxx – High-traffic telephone lines
 186000 – Financial Services and the Treasury Bureau of the Government of the Hong Kong SAR
 186111 – "GovWiFi" help desk
 186131 – Security Bureau, Government of the Hong Kong SAR
 186186 – Anti Narcotics Division, Security Bureau, Government of the Hong Kong SAR
 1868 – Immigration Department of the Government of the Hong Kong SAR (assistance to Hong Kong residents in distress)
 187xxxx – High traffic telephone lines
 18713xx – Macau phone gambling (Telebet)
 1872xxx – Radio station listener calls live program hotline
 1878xxx – Public service, fundraising, accidental death inquiries
 1879xxx – Public service, charity hotline
 1880 –  Hong Kong Jockey Club Customer Service
 1881 to 1889 – Hong Kong Jockey Club phone gambling (Telebet)
 189 – Disaster Response / Disaster Recovery
 19 – Test code / routing code
 200 – Telephone card access code
 201xxxxx to 206xxxxx – Fixed-line telephone
 207, 208, 209 – Telephone card access code
 21xxxxxx to 29xxxxxx – Fixed-line telephone
 28088000 to 28088099 – Telephone card access code
 3000xxx – Number Conversion Equipment
 301xxxxx to 304xxxxx – Non-external telecommunications services
 305xxxxx to 309xxxxx – External telecommunications services
 31xxxxxx – Fixed-line telephone
 34xxxxxx to 39xxxxxx – Fixed-line telephone
 4xxxxxxxxxxx – Network number
 504, 505, 507, 508, 509 – SMS / Multimedia value-added services
 51xxxxxx to 57xxxxxx – Mobile phone number
 58xxxxxx – 'Class 2 Service' such as voice over IP
 59xxxxxx – Mobile phone number
 6xxxxxxx – Mobile phone number
 7xxxxxxx – Mobile phone number & pager number
 800xxxxxx – Toll-free telephone number
 81xxxxxx to 83xxxxxx – Personal number service
 900xxxxxxxx – Information service
 901xxxxx to 989xxxxx – Mobile phone number
 990 to 998 – Emergency services (routing)
 999 – Emergency number (Police, Fire service and Ambulance)

Telephone exchanges in Hong Kong

Aberdeen – 6 Wong Chuk Hang Road
Castle Peak Bay – 138 Castle Peak Road-Castle Peak Bay
Chai Wan – 13-15 Cheung Lee Street near Kut Shing Street
Chek Lap Kok – 1 Chun Ming Rd, Chek Lap Kok
Cheung Chau – 31 Cheung Chau Sports Road
Cheung Sha – 57A Cheung Sha, Lantau Island
Clearwater Bay – East Telephone Exchange Tower, 38 Clearwater Bay Road
Causeway Bay – East Telephone Exchange Tower, 38 Leighton Road, Causeway Bay
Fanling – 21 Lok Yip Road
Fo Tan – 32-34 Shan Mei Street
Fortress Hill – 14 Fortress Hill Road
Ha Hang – 101 Ting Kok Road
Ho Man Tin – 43 Sheung Shing St, Ho Man Tin
Hung Hom – 140 Gillies Avenue North
Kennedy Town – 14 Smithfield Road, Sai Wan
Kowloon City – 28 Lung Kong Road
Kowloon Tong – 1 Kam Shing Road
Kwai Chung – Kwok Shui Road near Fu Uk Road
Kwai Shing – 298 Kwai Shing Circuit, Kwai Chung
Kwun Tong – 408 Kwun Tong Road
Lai Chi Kok – 2 Yuet Lun Street
Lamma Island – 70A Po Wah Yuen, Lamma Island
Lau Fau Shan – 13 Lau Fau Shan Road
Ma On Shan – 20 On Shing Street
Mong Kok – 37 Bute Street, Mong Kok, Kowloon
Ngau Tam Mei – 388 Castle Peak Road-Tam Mi
Ngau Tau Kok – 7 Siu Yip St, Kowloon Bay
North Point – 511 King's Road
Peng Chau – 5 Nam Shan Road, Peng Chau
Ping Che – 2 Ping Che Road
Repulse Bay – 6 beach road, Repulse Bay
Sai Kung – 66 Man Nin Street
Sha Tin – 14-16 Man Lai Road, Tai Wai
Sham Shui Po – 330 Cheung Sha Wan Road
Sham Tseng – 44 Castle Peak Road, Sham Tseng
Shau Kei Wan – 17 Sun Sing Street
Shek Kip Mei – 41 Wai Chi Street
Shek O – 185 Shek O Village
Sheung Shui – 88-98 Jockey Club Road
Sheung Wan – West Exchange Tower, 322 Des Voeux Road Central, Sheung Wan
Siu Lek Yuen – 18 Siu Lek Yuen Road
Stanley – 36 Stanley Village Road
Tai Hing – 6 Shek Pai Tau Rd, Tuen Mun
Tai Kok Tsui – 663 Shanghai Street, Mong Kok
Tai Po – 30 Kwong Fuk Square, Tai Po
Tai Po – 5 On Po Lane, Tai Po
Tin Shui Wai – 8 Tin Pak Rd, Tin Shui Wai
Tsing Yi – 12 Chung Mei Rd, Tsing Yi
Tsuen Wan – 303 Castle Peak Road, Tsuen Wan
Tseung Kwan O – 22 Wan Lung Road, Tseung Kwan O
Tuen Mun – 1 Hing On Lane
Tung Chung – 12 Cheung Tung Rd, Tung Chung
Wan Chai – 44-46 Wood Road
Wan Chai – Lockhart Telephone Exchange Tower, 3 Hennessy Road, Wan Chai
Wong Tai Sin – 19 Muk Lun Street, Wong Tai Sin
Yau Ma Tei – 524A Nathan Road
Yau Tong – 6 Tseung Kwan O Road, Lam Tin
Yuen Long – 170-184 Kau Yuk Road, Yuen Long

Historical numbering scheme and area codes

1970s
In the 1970s, area codes were assigned with the following pattern:
 3 Kowloon, New Kowloon, Ha Kwai Chung and Sai Kung
 5 Hong Kong Island and Outlying Islands
 12 New Territories

There was no standard trunk prefix like '0' – only the area code and phone number were dialed when calling from one area code to another. Thus the Kowloon number xxx-xxx would have been dialed as follows:

 xxx-xxx – from within Kowloon
 3 xxx-xxx – from Hong Kong Island or New Territories
 +852 3 xxx-xxx – from the rest of the world

1980s
In the mid-1980s, 6-digit numbers starting with '0' became 7-digit numbers starting with '71', making way for subsequent change of the New Territories prefix from '12' to '0'.

 0xxxxx became 71xxxxx

Fixed-line phone numbers were either six- or seven-digit in the 1980s. Area codes were assigned with the following patterns.
 3 Kowloon, New Kowloon, Ha Kwai Chung and Sai Kung
 5 Hong Kong Island and Outlying Islands
 0 New Territories

Cellular phone numbers are all eight-digit starting with '9'.

Easy Dialling Day
On 30 December 1989, area codes were abolished. Six-digit numbers in the New Territories were changed to replace the initial 8 with 46, followed by five digits; area codes for six-digit numbers in the other areas became part of subscriber's numbers. Area codes for seven-digit numbers were simply removed. Some six-digit numbers had the first digit changed to two digits to make a seven-digit number.
 (3) xxx xxx became 3xx xxxx
 (3) 7xx xxxx became 7xx xxxx
 (5) xxx xxx became 5xx xxxx
 (5) Nxx xxxx became Nxx xxxx (N = 8 or 9)
 (0) 8xx xxx became 46x xxxx
 (0) Nxx xxxx became Nxx xxxx (N = 4 or 6)

1990s

On January 1, 1995, a '2' was prefixed to all fixed line (land line) numbers which are now eight-digit. A '7' was prefixed to existing pager service numbers.
 xxx xxxx became 2xxx xxxx
 11xx xxx became 711xx xxx
 11xx xxxxx became 7xx xxxxx
 9xxx xxxx remain unchanged

Since 2000s

Before the introduction of portable fixed line numbers, numbers were assigned in a pattern akin to districts. For example, in addition to the existing 3, 5 and 0 prefixes, a 4 prefix was used for Tuen Mun and Yuen Long, 6 for Tai Po and Sha Tin, and 8 for Hong Kong Island.

Numbers starting with '3' were introduced when '2' for fixed lines started running out. Cell phone numbers remain eight-digit. The number '6' started to be used when numbers started with '9' were running out. In May 2008, cellular phone numbers with '5' as the beginning were also introduced.

Due to numerous phone scams spoofing local telephone numbers, calls started from outside Hong Kong using a local number now show the Hong Kong prefix +852 before the phone numbers in Caller ID.

See also
 Communications in Hong Kong
 Telephone numbers in Macau
 Telephone numbering plan

References

 ITU allocation list
 

Telephone numbers in China
Telephone numbering plan
Hong Kong communications-related lists